West Mesquite High School is a high school in Mesquite, Texas, United States. The school, which serves grades 9 through 12, is a part of the Mesquite Independent School District.

The school serves the western portion of Mesquite and most of the MISD portion of Balch Springs. The school mascot is the Wrangler. The school is located near the Mesquite Championship Rodeo at the Mesquite Arena, and was built on land once owned by the Rodeo. 

Memorial Stadium,  is on campus along with the Mesquite Tower which broadcasts the school district's own radio station, KEOM.

Athletics
West Mesquite High School currently participates as a UIL 5A (AAAAA) school in Football, Basketball, Tennis, Outdoor Track and Field, Cross Country, Golf, Soccer, Volleyball, Baseball, Softball, and Swimming.

Football
1992:The first winning season in WMHS history.

1994: WMHS finished 8-2 but missed the playoffs.

1995: WMHS wins their first district championship in high school football. The Wranglers finished the regular season a perfect 10-0, 5-0. Bi-District: Lost to Tyler Chapel Hill 35-15 in their first ever play off game.

1996: WM finished in a three way tie for first place in district 12-4A with Greenville and Terrell. 10-2, 4-1. Bi-District: WM 40, WT White 0. Area: Grapevine 42, WM 13.

From 1994-1996 the WM Wranglers compiled a 28-5 record under Head Coach Gary Johnson.

2006:  The Wranglers were 8-2, 6-1 and placed second in district 10-4A.  WM ended the regular season ranked #7 in the area. Bi-District:  Frisco 22, West Mesquite 19 (3 OTs)

2007:  First year with Mike Overton as head coach. The Wranglers ended the regular season 7-3, 5-2.  They finished second in the very tough district 10-4A.  BiDistrict:  West Mesquite 35, Lake Dallas 28. Area:  West Mesquite 47,  Whitehouse 29.Regional Semi-Finals:  West Mesquite 41, Red Oak 28. State Quarter-Finals:  Highland Park(49) beat West (6).  The Wranglers ended their season with a record of 10-4.

2008: West ended the year with a 6-5, 5-1 record and qualified for post season play.  Bi District:  Waxahachie beat West in the first round of the playoffs.

2010: West ended the regular season 8-2, 6-2 district, losing to Lancaster and Forney in district 15-4A. West ended the season with an average score of over 40 points per game, the lowest overall 21-42 loss against Lancaster, and the highest being 63-56 win against Waxahachie. BiDistrict: West Mesquite 48, Pflugerville Hendrickson 39. West advanced past the first round for the first time since 2007. Area: West Mesquite 55, Sherman 34.  Regional Semi-Finals: West Mesquite 30, Wylie 38.

Baseball
1992: West Mesquite was UIL State Runner-Up to Robstown. Bi-District:  West Mesquite over Dallas: Jefferson 1-0 Area:  West Mesquite over Coppell 4-3. Regional:  West Mesquite over Texarkana: Liberty-Eylau 5-4. State Quarterfinal:  West Mesquite over Dallas: White 4-1. State Semi-Final:  West Mesquite over West Orange-Stark 8-7. State Final:  Robstown over West Mesquite 7-6

Notable alumni
Craig Wayne Boyd, Winner of Season 7 of The Voice (U.S.) in 2014
Trevone Boykin, former backup quarterback for the Seattle Seahawks, he played quarterback for the TCU Horned Frogs
Alyssa Edwards, American drag performer, contestant on the fifth season of RuPaul's Drag Race
Ty Jordan College freshman of the year, played for the Utah Utes football

References

External links
 West Mesquite High School

Mesquite Independent School District high schools
Mesquite, Texas